Halfweg (Dutch for "halfway") is the name of several villages in the Netherlands and a place in South Africa:

 Halfweg, North Holland, located on the Haarlemmertrekvaart halfway between Amsterdam and Haarlem
 Halfweg (Beemster), North Holland
 Halfweg (Overijssel)
 Halfweg (South Holland), located on the Leidsevaart halfway between Leiden and Haarlem
 Halfweg (Friesland)
 Halfweg (Northern Cape, South Africa), located half way on the Sishen–Saldanha railway line as a crew change place for the train driver and train driver assistants.